

Paul Gurran (11 January 1893 – 22 February 1944) was a German general in the Wehrmacht during World War II. He was a recipient of the Knight's Cross of the Iron Cross of Nazi Germany. He was married to Irmgard Begrich, a cousin of Joachim Begrich. Gurran died on 22 February 1944 in a field hospital in the occupied Soviet Union. He was posthumously promoted to Generalleutnant.

Awards and decorations

 Knight's Cross of the Iron Cross on 12 September 1941 as Oberst and commander of Infanterie-Regiment 506

References

Citations

Bibliography

 
 

1893 births
1944 deaths
People from Dahme-Spreewald
People from the Province of Brandenburg
Lieutenant generals of the German Army (Wehrmacht)
German Army personnel of World War I
Recipients of the clasp to the Iron Cross, 1st class
Recipients of the Knight's Cross of the Iron Cross
German Army personnel killed in World War II
Military personnel from Brandenburg